David Sturtevant Ruder (May 25, 1929 – February 15, 2020) was the William W. Gurley Memorial Professor of Law Emeritus at Northwestern University School of Law, where he served on the faculty since 1961, and where he served as dean from 1977 to 1985. He served as chairman of U.S. Securities and Exchange Commission from 1987 to 1989, and later practiced with the Chicago-based law firm Baker & McKenzie. He served as chairman of the Mutual Fund Directors Forum, an organization providing education to independent directors of mutual funds, from 2002 to 2010 and was the organization's chairman emeritus.

Ruder was a 1951 graduate of Williams College (B.A. cum laude) and a 1957 graduate of the University of Wisconsin Law School (J.D., with honors). He received an honorary Doctor of Laws in 2002 from the University of Wisconsin–Madison.

On May 14, 2008, Ruder, together with two other former SEC chairmen, William Donaldson and Arthur Levitt, endorsed Barack Obama's candidacy for President.

References

External links
 Northwestern University School of Law Biography

Members of the U.S. Securities and Exchange Commission
1929 births
2020 deaths
Williams College alumni
Deans of law schools in the United States
University of Wisconsin Law School alumni
Northwestern University Pritzker School of Law faculty
Wisconsin Republicans
Illinois Republicans
Reagan administration personnel
George H. W. Bush administration personnel